The HTC Prophet is a combined Personal Digital Assistant (PDA) and mobile telephone manufactured by HTC.

It was released onto the UK market by Orange UK in April 2006 under the name Orange SPV M600. In Asia, it is marketed under the name Dopod 818 pro. It is also available on other networks as the Qtek S200 or the i-mate JAMin.

Features

Closely resembling the HTC Magician, the device is a 2.75G phone with a 2.8" 240x320 touchscreen, a 2.0-megapixel digital camera, Bluetooth 2.0 without EDR (equivalent to version 1.2 with additional bug fixes), WiFi 802.11b/g, Infrared Technology, Microsoft Push email access, 128 MB internal memory and a full sized SD card slot (no SDHC support). It is based on the Microsoft Windows Mobile 5.0 Professional platform, and was among the first Pocket PC phones to use the operating system. It has Microsoft Word, Excel and PowerPoint. The phone also includes Pocket Internet Explorer and Windows Media Player 10 Mobile as well as some carrier or provider specific software.

Specifications

Texas Instruments OMAP 850 200 MHz CPU
128 MB ROM, 64 RAM;
Talk time 5.0 hours
Standby 200 hours
Weight: 150g
2.0-megapixel camera, Macro Mode.
Bluetooth
Email
Infrared connection
MP3 player
Polyphonic ring tones
True Tones
MP3 Ringtones
Video Messaging
Wap
WiFi

Windows Mobile 6 (Crossbow)

There are several "unofficial" builds of Windows Mobile 6 (Crossbow), WM6.1 and even some Windows Mobile 6.5 builds which run on this device, and now even some tools which allow users to create their own custom WM6 ROM images (a process most commonly known by the term "cooking ROM's"). There is a thriving semi-underground community of people dedicated to improving these WM6 builds (and associated tools) on the Prophet, most notably xda-developers.

Unlocking

The Prophet can be unlocked if required using Lokiwiz .

External links
 XDA Developers Wiki HTC Prophet

Prophet
Windows Mobile Professional devices
Mobile phones introduced in 2006